The 2003–04 Washington Huskies men's basketball team represented the University of Washington for the 2003–04 NCAA Division I men's basketball season. Led by second-year head coach Lorenzo Romar, the Huskies were members of the Pacific-10 Conference and played their home games on campus at Hec Edmundson Pavilion in 

Washington lost their first five Pac-10 games, then won twelve of thirteen to finish as runner-up. In the eight-team conference tournament, they defeated UCLA in the quarterfinal and Arizona in the semifinal, the first team in 65 years to defeat the Wildcats three times in one  In the final, they met top seed Stanford; a week earlier, the undefeated Cardinal traveled to Seattle and lost by thirteen points. It was a different outcome in the tourney in Los Angeles as Stanford won by eleven points.

Washington returned to the NCAA tournament for the first time in five years, and were seeded eighth in the St. Louis regional. In the first round at Columbus, Ohio, the Huskies scored a hundred points, but lost to ninth seed UAB

Postseason results

|-
!colspan=5 style=| Pacific-10 Tournament

|-
!colspan=6 style=| NCAA tournament

References

External links
Sports Reference – Washington Huskies: 2003–04 basketball season

Washington Huskies men's basketball seasons
Washington Huskies
Washington
Washington
Washington